FC Torpedo-2 is a Russian football team from Moscow, founded in 2022. It is a farm club for the Russian Premier League team FC Torpedo Moscow.

History
In the Russian championships in 1992–2000, the Torpedo-d team participated in the second and third leagues and the first two draws of the Russian Cup.

On January 26, 2022, the Board of Directors of Torpedo Moscow decided to revive the farm-club for its further participation in Russian Football National League 2.

Current squad
As of 27 February 2023, according to the Second League website.

Coaching staff

References

Association football clubs established in 2022
Torpedo-2
FC Torpedo Moscow
2022 establishments in Russia